Tjaša Rudman  (born 16 August 1996) is a Slovenian handball player for ŽRK Mlinotest Ajdovščina and the Slovenian national team.

She was selected to represent Slovenia at the 2017 World Women's Handball Championship.

References

1996 births
Living people
Slovenian female handball players
Sportspeople from Novo Mesto